The 1990–91 National Soccer League season, was the 15th season of the National Soccer League in Australia.

Regular season

League table

Finals series

Individual awards
Player of the Year: Milan Ivanovic (Adelaide City)
U-21 Player of the Year: Paul Okon (Marconi Fairfield)
Top Scorer: David Seal (Marconi Fairfield) – 19 goals
Coach of the Year: Zoran Matic (Adelaide City)

References
Australia - List of final tables (RSSSF)
NSL Awards at ozfootball.net

National Soccer League (Australia) seasons
1991 in Australian soccer
1990 in Australian soccer
Aus
Aus